The Las Vegas Arts District, or the 18b in Downtown Las Vegas, Nevada was created in 1998 as an 18 block zone set aside to encourage art and artists.

The district won Las Vegas Review-Journals Best of Las Vegas award in 2005.

Also known as 18b, the Las Vegas Arts District contains a mix of independent businesses including vintage clothing boutiques, antique stores, art galleries, hair salons, residences, restaurants and breweries.  

The 18b is located halfway between the Fremont East Entertainment district and the Stratosphere Resort, clustered around Main and Charleston, bounded loosely by Commerce Street to the West, Hoover Avenue to the North, Fourth Street to the East and Colorado Avenue at the south. It is an easy bike ride, walk or bus ride from Fremont Street.  The name, "18b," represents the original Arts District area, which consisted of 18 blocks. Today, the Arts District area has grown beyond those original 18 blocks and is a classic urban mix of residential, commercial and cultural uses that will continue to grow as the hub of the arts scene in Las Vegas.

Eclectic and always changing, the Las Vegas Arts District continues to grow, offering visitors and locals a taste of Las Vegas that is not the average tourist spot.

Events 
The district hosts a First Friday art walk on the first Friday of every month.  First Friday offers an eclectic group of artists as well as "entertainers of all types, including local bands, fire breathers, acrobats, break dancers, fortune tellers and performance artists."

Boundaries 
Recently expanded, the district is loosely bounded by Gass Avenue (in the north), Imperial Avenue (in the south), Las Vegas Boulevard (to the east), and Commerce Street (to the west). The official bounds are visible on the City of Las Vegas website.

References 

Downtown Las Vegas
Arts districts
Culture of Las Vegas
Tourist attractions in the Las Vegas Valley